Carlos Ramos (born 1 December 1986 in Rotterdam) is a Dutch footballer who played for Eerste Divisie league club RBC Roosendaal during the 2008-2010 seasons. In the 2014–15 season he played for ASWH.

References

Dutch footballers
Footballers from Rotterdam
RBC Roosendaal players
Eerste Divisie players
1986 births
Living people
ASWH players
Association football midfielders